William Douglas (6 June 1848 – 7 September 1887) was a New Zealand cricketer. He played one first-class match for Otago in 1878/79. He was out first ball in both of his innings, recording a king pair.

Douglas was born at Longford, Tasmania in 1848 and was educated at Horton College on the island. He worked as a manager.

References

1848 births
1887 deaths
New Zealand cricketers
Otago cricketers
Cricketers from Tasmania